State Road 283 (NM 283) is a  state highway in the U.S. state of New Mexico. NM 283's northern terminus is at the end of state maintenance west of Las Vegas, and the southern terminus is at Romeroville Frontage Road east of I-25 and south of Las Vegas.

Major intersections

See also

References

283
Transportation in San Miguel County, New Mexico